Phrynopus peruanus is a species of frog in the family Strabomantidae.
It is endemic to Peru.
Its natural habitat is subtropical or tropical moist montane forests.

References

peruanus
Amphibians of the Andes
Amphibians of Peru
Endemic fauna of Peru
Amphibians described in 1873
Taxa named by Wilhelm Peters
Taxonomy articles created by Polbot